West Wollongong is the innermost western suburb of the coastal city of Wollongong, New South Wales, Australia. It is mainly a residential area, serviced by a small commercial strip with a music store, chicken shop, electric goods store and carpet store along the Princes Highway with several petrol stations, two restaurants, a liquor store, a chemist and a flower shop. 

Schools in the area include West Wollongong Public School, St Therese Primary School, and Edmund Rice College (an all-boys secondary college).

St Marks Anglican Church serves the area of West Wollongong in a variety of ways. The church runs an EFL class (English for Life), Food and friends, Playgroup, Youthgroup, Mother's Union, University Student Housing, Soccer teams' as well as their three services on a Sunday (8am, 10am and 5pm) that cater for a variety of ages including children. The church is open during the week with Saint's Espresso and a playground for people to connect with and to support the community. (see James Ulrich the local church historian for more details)

It is the location of the Mount Keira Road turnoff from the Princes Highway, incidentally the westernmost end of Crown Street.

Illawarra Institute of TAFE also has a campus at West Wollongong with a focus on Information Technology, Hairdressing, Beauty Therapy, Arts and Media, Fashion Technologies, Meat and Allied Trades. It includes Karoona Gallery.

References

Suburbs of Wollongong